Ghadir-e Sab (also Romanized as Ghadīr-e Sab‘; also known as 'Qadīr-e Sab‘ and Qadīr Sab‘) is a village in Abdoliyeh-ye Sharqi Rural District, in the Central District of Ramshir County, Khuzestan Province, Iran. At the 2006 census, its population was 114, in 20 families.

References 

Populated places in Ramshir County